= KingsRoad =

2013 video game

- Developer: Rumble Entertainment
- Publisher: Rumble Entertainment
- Platforms: Facebook, browser
- Release: March 2013
- Genre: MMORPG
- Mode: Multiplayer

KingsRoad is a browser-based massively multiplayer online role-playing game made by American studio Rumble Entertainment.

The story line of the game is similar to a fairy tale. In the absence of the king, a kingdom was captured by some evil enemies. As warrior for the King, players band together and fight enemies in order to free the princess. The game has 3D-style graphics that use Flash Player. When you have finished the main quest of the game, you will unlock dungeon mode. In dungeon mode, you face short levels and can get powerful set items. Also, every 2 weeks there's an event, and to participate in the bronze grade (first grade of the 4 grades) you need a power level of 1100 points. In events, you can get some of the most powerful items in the whole game.

== Gameplay ==
Like similar role-playing games, KingsRoad deals with different character classes of brave warriors, 3 to be exact, the archer, knight and the wizard. While playing different maps the players level up and gain different abilities. Players choose different ability levels, which relate to the ease of completing the game. There are different scoreboards in the KingsRoad world. You can talk to friends. You can friend people. You can join, and create guilds and parties. There are also arenas. Friends may be invited, for a maximum of 3 for regular co-op, and 4 for Battle Coliseum fights. There are (daily) Achievements for which you can earn rewards.

== Development ==
Greg Richardson and Mark Spenner, two former Electronic Arts employees, were involved in the creation of the game. They created with the idea of a city called Alderstone.

== Characters ==
In Kings road there are 3 classes: The Archer, Knight, and Wizard.

Each of these classes are known for their defining abilities in battle. The archer is skilled at range, while the knight specializes in melee combat and brute force. The Wizard casts magical spells. There are other characters in the hub area, which is known as Longford Square. They have certain abilities, such as socketing jewels, bring the player to the Dragon Village, or store items in bank form.
